The 2017 Paris Sevens was the 15th edition of the France Sevens, and the ninth tournament of the 2016–17 World Rugby Sevens Series. The tournament was played on 13–14 May 2017 at Stade Jean-Bouin in Paris.

South Africa won the Cup final, defeating Scotland by 15–5 to clinch the overall series title for the season with an unassailable lead over the defending champions Fiji. New Zealand finished third in the Paris tournament, and Argentina won the Challenge trophy for ninth place.

Format
The teams were drawn into four pools of four teams each. Each team played all the others in their pool once. The top two teams from each pool advanced to the Cup quarter finals. The bottom two teams from each group advanced to the Challenge Trophy quarter finals.

Teams
The sixteen participating teams for the tournament were:

Pool stages

Pool A

Pool B

Pool C

Pool D

Knockout stage

13th place

Challenge Trophy

5th place

Cup

Tournament placings

Source: World Rugby (archived)

References

External links
Official Site

France Sevens
2016–17 World Rugby Sevens Series
2016–17 in French rugby union